Yolanda Gil is a Spanish computer scientist specializing in knowledge discovery and knowledge-based systems at the University of Southern California (USC). She served as chair of SIGAI the Association for Computing Machinery (ACM) Special Interest Group (SIG) on Artificial Intelligence, and the president of the Association for the Advancement of Artificial Intelligence (AAAI).

Education
Gil is from Madrid, and earned a licenciate in Computer Science from the Technical University of Madrid in 1985. She did her graduate studies at Carnegie Mellon University, completing her Ph.D. in 1992. Her dissertation was supervised by Jaime Carbonell.

Career and research
Gil's research interests are in Artificial Intelligence, Intelligent User Interfaces, Knowledge Capture, Scientific workflows and the  Semantic Web.

Gil joined the University of Southern California as a research scientist at the Information Sciences Institute in 1992. At USC, she is a Research Professor of Computer Science and Spatial Sciences, Associate Division Director at the Information Sciences Institute, and director of the Center for Knowledge-Powered Interdisciplinary Data Science in the USC Viterbi School of Engineering.

Awards and honors
Gil was elected the chair of SIGAI the Association for Computing Machinery (ACM) Special Interest Group (SIG) on Artificial Intelligence for two terms, from 2010 to 2016. She is president of the Association for the Advancement of Artificial Intelligence for 2018 to 2020.

She was nominated a Fellow of the Association for the Advancement of Artificial Intelligence (AAAI) in 2012, and a Fellow of the Association for Computing Machinery in 2016 "for leadership in advancing the use of artificial intelligence in support of science, and for service to the community".

References

Year of birth missing (living people)
Living people
American computer scientists
Spanish computer scientists
American women computer scientists
Spanish women computer scientists
Northeastern University faculty
Polytechnic University of Madrid alumni
Carnegie Mellon University alumni
University of Southern California faculty
Fellows of the Association for the Advancement of Artificial Intelligence
Fellows of the Association for Computing Machinery
Semantic Web people